Caloptilia alnivorella, the alder leafminer, is a moth of the family Gracillariidae. The species was first described by Vactor Tousey Chambers in 1875. It is known from the Russian Far East, Canada (Québec, Nova Scotia, Ontario and the Northwest Territories) and the United States (including Vermont, Utah, Maine, California, Colorado and Michigan).

The wingspan is about 14 mm. Adults overwinter in the fall and come out in the spring to mate.

The larvae feed on Acer negundo, Alnus species (including Alnus crispa var. mollis, Alnus glutinosa, Alnus incana, Alnus japonica, Alnus mollis, Alnus rubra, Alnus tenuifolia and Alnus viridis), Betula papyrifera and Quercus garryana. They mine the leaves of their host plant. The mine starts as a short, narrow, Phyllocnistis-like mine on the upperside of the leaf. Later instars form tents by bending the lateral edges and attaching them together. Within the tent, a small fold is made at the edge for a pupation site. The cocoon is found within the fold or on the surface of the leaf.

References

External links

alnivorella
Moths of Asia
Moths of North America
Moths described in 1875